The 2003 South American Youth Championship (Sudamericana sub-20) is a football competition contested by all ten U-20 national football teams of CONMEBOL. The tournament was held in Uruguay between 4 January and 28 January 2003, it was the 21st time the competition has been held and the second to take place in Uruguay. Argentina won their fourth trophy.

Venues

Format
The teams are separated in two groups of five, and each team plays four matches in a pure round-robin stage. The three top competitors advance to a single final group of six, wherein each team plays five matches. The top four teams in the final group qualify to the 2003 FIFA U-20 World Cup.

Squads
For a list of all the squads in the final tournament, see 2003 South American Youth Championship squads.

The following teams entered the tournament:

 
 
 
 
 
 
 
 
  (host)

First group stage

When teams finish level of points, the final order determined according to:
 superior goal difference in all matches
 greater number of goals scored in all group matches
 better result in matches between tied teams
 drawing of lots

Group A

Results

Group B

Results

Final group

Results

Winners

Qualifiers for 2003 FIFA U-20 World Cup

Top scorers

8 goals
 Fernando Cavenaghi

4 goals
 Dagoberto
 Jaime Ruiz
 Dante López
 Erwin Ávalos

3 goals
 Daniel Carvalho
 Felipe Melo
 William
 Abel Aguilar
 Jhonny Acosta
 Víctor Montaño
 Marcelo Guerrero
 Jorge Martínez

2 goals
 Emanuel Benito Rivas
 Juan Carlos Arce
 Carlos Alberto
 Cleiton Xavier
 Dudu Cearense
 Roberto Mina
 Félix Borja
 Blas López
 Ángel Martínez
 Jefferson Farfán
 Rubén Olivera
 Guillermo Rodríguez

External links
2003 South American Youth Championship at Conmebol official website
Sudamericano at the RSSSF

Youth Championship
2003 in Uruguayan football
South American Youth Championship
International association football competitions hosted by Uruguay
2003 in youth association football